Pecos Independent Schools (also known as the Pecos Independent School District) is a public school district based in Pecos, New Mexico, United States. The district covers a  area in western San Miguel County.

The district's service area includes: Pecos, East Pecos, North San Ysidro, Rowe, and Soham.

Schools
Grades 6-12
Pecos Middle School & High School
Grades PK-5
Pecos Elementary School

Enrollment
2007-2008 School Year: 722 students
2006-2007 School Year: 748 students
2005-2006 School Year: 767 students
2004-2005 School Year: 828 students
2003-2004 School Year: 869 students
2002-2003 School Year: 859 students
2001-2002 School Year: 816 students
2000-2001 School Year: 889 students

Demographics
There were a total of 1,795 students enrolled in Pecos Independent Schools during the 2007–2008 school year. The gender makeup of the district was 45.43% female and 54.57% male. The racial makeup of the district was 89.89% Hispanic, 8.17% White, 1.26% African American, 0.66% Native American, and 0.14% Asian/Pacific Islander.

See also
List of school districts in New Mexico

References

External links
Pecos Independent Schools – Official site.

School districts in New Mexico
Education in San Miguel County, New Mexico